Sydney Olympic Park metro station is a proposed station on the Sydney Metro West that will serve Sydney Olympic Park. It is to be built between Herb Elliot Avenue and Figtree Drive, to the south of the existing Olympic Park railway station. The main station entrance will be between Herb Elliot Avenue and Figtree Drive, with a second entry off Dawn Fraser Avenue. It is scheduled to open with the rest of the line by 2030.

References

External links
Sydney Olympic Park Metro station Sydney Metro

Proposed Sydney Metro stations
Railway stations scheduled to open in 2030
Sydney Olympic Park